Lensia is a genus of hydrozoans belonging to the family Diphyidae.

The genus has cosmopolitan distribution.

Species

Species:

Lensia achilles 
Lensia ajax 
Lensia asymmetrica

References

Diphyidae
Hydrozoan genera